Summer services is the annual meeting of the Finnish Lutheran movement known as Conservative Laestadians. In addition to the primary Finnish gathering, similar meetings are arranged in North America, Sweden and Russia.

Suviseurat in Finland
Summer services (Finnish: Suviseurat) is a large gathering of Laestadians in Finland. The event occurs every year at the end of June.  It is organized and hosted  by a Finnish Conservative Laestadianism association known as the Suomen rauhanyhdistysten keskusyhdistys (SRK). Summer services are among the most visited Finnish summer festivals and the largest spiritual meeting. Summer services are attended by tens of thousands of visitors from Finland, Russia, Estonia, Sweden, Norway, United States, Canada and many other countries. The number of visitors reaches its peak usually on Saturday night, when the services have 80,000 simultaneous visitors.

Summer services take place over the course of four days, usually a Friday through Monday. The program consist mainly of sermons and hymns and songs of Zion. The Summer services areas is about 100 hectares (270 acres).  The size of the event requires the need for loudspeakers to carry sermons to all of the listeners. On Saturday Holy Communion is offered and in the evening there is a presentation which is mainly for younger listeners. A gathering for pastors is also held during the Summer services.

The Summer Services take place in a different location every year. 2020 summer services in Reisjärvi will be 112th in order. Services were held in for the first time in 1906 with Oulu being the host city.

Recently, sermons have been broadcast via the Internet into many languages.

Host cities in Finland 

(†) 1915 summer services in Alakainuu, Sweden were cancelled due to typhoid fever epidemic.
(††) 1941 summer services in Haapajärvi were cancelled due to Continuation War.
(†††) 1944 summer services in Nivala were officially cancelled due to Continuation War. Nevertheless, the cancellation message did not reach everyone and thousands of guests and speakers arrived. Services were held unofficially.

Summer services in North America

Summer services in North America are arranged by members of the Laestadian Lutheran Church.

They take place every year during the first weekend of July. They are mostly attended by North American guests, but some guests come from Finland, Ecuador, Togo, and elsewhere.

The service schedule consists of devotional speeches and Songs and Hymns of Zion.  The purpose of the services is to invite all people to hear the Word of God.  The core of the proclamation is the message of Jesus as the redeemer of sins and the call to repentance.

2013 - Deer Park, Washington hosted by Spokane Laestadian Lutheran Church

2014 - Rogers, Minnesota hosted by Rockford Laestadian Lutheran Church

2015 - Outlook, Saskatchewan hosted by Outlook Laestadian Lutheran Church

2016 - Essa Township, Ontario hosted by Toronto Laestadian Lutheran Church

2017 - Howard Lake, Minnesota hosted by Cokato Laestadian Lutheran Church

2018 - Snohomish, Washington hosted by Seattle Laestadian Lutheran Church

2019 - Monticello, Minnesota hosted by Rockford Laestadian Lutheran Church

2020 - Loretto, Minnesota hosted by Laestadian Lutheran Church

2021 - Monticello, Minnesota hosted by Laestadian Lutheran Church

2022 - Kelso, Washington hosted by Longview Laestadian Lutheran Church

2023 - Monticello, Minnesota hosted by Monticello Laestadian Lutheran Church

2024 - Monticello, Minnesota hosted by Northern Minnesota Congregations

Sources

External links

 Official English website of the Finnish Summer Services
 Summer Services in North America

Lutheranism in Finland
Laestadianism
Annual events in Finland
Summer events in Finland